Cutis is the combined term for the epidermis and the dermis, the two outer layers of the skin. The subcutis is the layer below the cutis. Sweat pores are contained in the cutis, along with other organs, while hair follicles are contained in the subcutis, along with sweat glands and nerves.

Skin anatomy